A College of Arts and Sciences or School of Arts and Sciences is most commonly an individual institution or a unit within a university that focuses on instruction of the liberal arts and pure sciences, although they frequently include programs and faculty in fine arts, social sciences, and other disciplines such as humanities. They are especially found in North America and the Philippines.

In contrast, an "art school" or "college/school of arts" usually refers to a unit or institution that cultivates visual or performing arts; a "liberal arts college" usually refers to a standalone institution; and a "college/school of (applied) arts and technology" typically refers to places for vocational education.

There are many alternative names, of which the most common include College (or School) of

 Arts and Sciences
 Arts and Letters
 Arts and Social Sciences
 Humanities
 Letters
 Letters and Science
 Liberal Arts
 Liberal Arts and Sciences
 Natural Sciences
 Science
 Social Sciences
 Social Sciences and Philosophy

University
These are "Arts and Sciences" units that are part of a larger post-secondary institution.

Typically, Colleges of (Liberal) Arts and Sciences at a non-specialized university include a rather large number of departments offering a significant number of majors/minors or courses of study. Such departments/majors commonly include mathematics and "pure sciences" such as biology, chemistry, and physics for which B.S. and maybe M.S. degrees are offered, as well as a significant selection of liberal arts. The "liberal arts" may include social sciences such as psychology, sociology, anthropology and other social studies such as history, geography, political science, etc. and language studies including English and other languages, linguistics, writing, literature, and communication arts and a variety of humanities and other fields of study. The sciences may offer B.S. and maybe M.S. degrees, and the other majors may offer B.A. and maybe M.A. degrees. Humanities may include such fields of study as philosophy, classical studies, theology or religious studies, and certain others. Other fields of study may be lumped into a College of (Liberal) Arts and Sciences; however, certain specialized and professional fields are taught in more specialized colleges or schools such as a College of Engineering, College of Business Administration, College of Education, Public policy school, or a College of Fine Arts and certain graduate level schools such as law schools, medical schools, dental schools, etc. The situation may also vary between continents and their various countries.

In many non-specialized universities, the College of (Liberal) Arts and Sciences is one of the largest colleges on the campus, and many students even from other colleges or schools take and are even required to take courses offered by the College of (Liberal) Arts and Sciences, such as mathematics and sometimes certain sciences. A College of (Liberal) Arts and Sciences commonly has a core curriculum which all students in the College must take, regardless of their major in the College. Such a core curriculum may specify that certain courses by their students must be taken, or may require elective courses to be taken within certain areas to provide a well-rounded education for each student. Other colleges or schools within a university could have different core curriculum requirements for their students. For each major and minor field of study, certain minimum courses and usually some electives must be taken within that area for a degree.

Australia
Australian National University, College of Arts and Social Sciences
University of Adelaide, School of Social Sciences
University of Queensland, School of Social Science
Western Sydney University, School of Social Sciences

Canada
 College of Arts & Science, University of Saskatchewan
 School of Arts & Science, Seneca College

Japan
National
College of Arts and Sciences, University of Tokyo, Komaba Campus
Faculty of integrated human studies, Kyoto University
School of Interdisciplinary Science and Innovation, Kyushu University
School of Integrated Arts and Sciences, Hiroshima University
School of Integrated Arts and Sciences, University of Tokushima
Faculty of Liberal Arts, Saitama University
Public
 Faculty of Liberal Arts, Tsuru University
 International College of Arts and Sciences, Yokohama City University
Private
College of Liberal Arts, International Christian University
College of Humanities and Sciences, Nihon University

New Zealand
University of Auckland, School of Social Sciences

Philippines
Ateneo de Davao University, School of Arts and Sciences
Ateneo de Manila University, School of Humanities
Ateneo de Manila University, School of Science and Engineering
Ateneo de Manila University, School of Social Sciences
Bicol University, College of Science
Bicol University, College of Social Sciences and Philosophy
Bulacan State University, College of Arts and Letters
Bulacan State University, College of Science
Bulacan State University, College of Social Sciences and Philosophy
Cavite State University, College of Arts and Sciences
Cebu Normal University, College of Arts and Sciences
Central Luzon State University, College of Arts and Social Sciences
Central Luzon State University, College of Science
Central Philippine University College of Arts and Sciences
De La Salle University College of Liberal Arts
De La Salle University College of Science
Don Honorio Ventura State University, College of Arts and Sciences
Don Honorio Ventura State University, College of Social Sciences and Philosophy
Far Eastern University – Institute of Arts and Sciences
Manila Central University, College of Arts and Sciences
Manuel S. Enverga University Foundation, College of Arts and Sciences
Mapua University, School of Social Science and Education
Mariano Marcos State University, College of Arts and Sciences
Mindanao State University-General Santos City, College of Social Sciences and Humanities
Mindanao State University-Iligan Institute of Technology, College of Arts and Social Sciences
Mindoro State University, College of Arts and Sciences
Nueva Ecija University of Science and Technology, College of Arts and Sciences
Pamantasan ng Lungsod ng Maynila, College of Humanities, Arts and Social Sciences
Pampanga State Agricultural University, College of Arts and Sciences
Polytechnic University of the Philippines, College of Arts and Letters
Polytechnic University of the Philippines, College of Science
Polytechnic University of the Philippines, College of Social Sciences and Development
Saint Louis University (Philippines), School of Natural Sciences
Saint Louis University (Philippines), School of Teacher Education and Liberal Arts
San Beda Manila, College of Arts and Sciences
Silliman University College of Arts and Sciences
Tarlac State University, College of Arts and Social Sciences
Tarlac State University, College of Science
Technological University of the Philippines, College of Science
University of Antique, College of Arts and Sciences 
University of Asia and the Pacific, College of Arts and Sciences
University of Batangas, College of Arts and Sciences
University of Caloocan City, College of Liberal Arts and Sciences
University of San Carlos, School of Arts and Sciences
University of Santo Tomas College of Science
University of Santo Tomas Faculty of Arts and Letters
University of Southern Mindanao, College of Arts and Social Sciences
University of the Cordilleras, College of Arts and Sciences
University of the Philippines Baguio, College of Social Sciences
University of the Philippines Cebu, College of Social Sciences
University of the Philippines Diliman, College of Arts and Letters
University of the Philippines Diliman, College of Science
University of the Philippines Diliman, College of Social Sciences and Philosophy
University of the Philippines Los Baños, College of Arts and Sciences
University of the Philippines Manila, College of Arts and Sciences
University of the Philippines Mindanao, College of Humanities and Social Sciences
Visayas State University, College of Arts and Science
Wesleyan University Philippines, College of Arts and Sciences
Western Mindanao State University, College of Social Sciences
Xavier University – Ateneo de Cagayan, College of Arts and Sciences

Russia
Smolny College, Saint Petersburg State University

United Kingdom 
Aston University, School of Social Sciences and Humanities
Birmingham City University, School of Social Sciences
Cardiff University, School of Social Sciences
London Metropolitan University, School of Social Sciences
Sheffield Hallam University, College of Social Sciences and Arts
Swansea University, College of Arts and Humanities
University College London, UCL Arts and Sciences
University of Aberdeen, School of Social Science
University of Birmingham, College of Social Sciences
University of Bradford, School of Social Sciences
University of Brighton, School of Humanities and Social Sciences
University of Dundee, School of Social Sciences
University of Edinburgh, College of Arts, Humanities and Social Sciences
University of Glasgow, College of Social Sciences
University of Greenwich, School of Humanities and Social Sciences
University of Lincoln, College of Social Science
University of Manchester, School of Social Sciences
University of the Arts London
University of Westminster, School of Social Sciences

United States

Independent
A number of independent institutions, almost entirely postsecondary, also refer to themselves as a college of arts and sciences. These include the following:

Canada

 Arts and Science Academy of Canada, in Vaughan, Ontario
 Canadian Arts & Sciences Institute, in Vancouver, BC
 La Citadelle International Academy of Arts & Science, in North York, Toronto, Ontario

India
Alpha Arts & Science College
Dr.N.G.P. Arts and Science College, Coimbatore
Dr. MGR-Janaki College of Arts and Science for Women
GTN Arts & Science College
Ideal College of Arts and Sciences
KG College of Arts and Science
Kongu Arts and Science College
Arts and Science College, Honnavar
Mar Gregorios College of Arts and Science, Chennai
Mary Matha Arts & Science College
MES's M. M. College of Arts and Science, Sirsi
MVM Arts and Science College
PSG College of Arts and Science
R. Shankar Memorial Arts and Science College
Rathinam College of Arts and Science
Shri Nehru Maha Vidyalaya College of Arts & Sciences
T S Narayanaswami College of Arts and Science
V.O.C. Arts & Science College
Aditanar College of Arts & Science
University Arts and Science College, Warangal

Nigeria
Rivers State College of Arts and Science in Port Harcourt
Akwa Ibom State College of Art and Science in Ikono

United States
Massachusetts College of Liberal Arts
North Springs Charter School of Arts and Sciences
Thomas More College of Liberal Arts

References 

Arts and sciences